Montfrin is a commune in the Gard department in southern France.

Population
The residents are called Montfrinois in French.

Geography
Montfrin is located between Nîmes and Avignon,  from Pont du Gard. The Gardon flows through the commune.

History
In Roman times, the place was called Mons Ferinus (mountain of the ferocious animals).

Charles Martel fought a battle there against the Saracens in 736, four years after the Battle of Tours.

The village has attracted celebrities during its history (including François I, Richelieu, Molière), and until the French Revolution, due to the presence of a "healing" spring, the spring of Fontcluse. A story says that the virtues of the spring were discovered by Charles Martel, who witnessed the healing of wounded soldiers after the battle.

Personalities
 Keith Floyd until his death in 2009

See also
Communes of the Gard department

References

Communes of Gard